Henry-Senachwine High School, or HSHS, is a public four-year high school located at 1023 College Street in Henry, Illinois, a village in Marshall County, Illinois, in the Midwestern United States. HSHS serves the communities of Henry and Putnam. The campus is located 30 miles northeast of Peoria, Illinois, and serves a mixed village and rural residential community.

Academics

Potential reference/citation:

Athletics
Henry-Senachwine High School competes in the Tri-County Conference and is a member school in the Illinois High School Association. Their mascot is the Mallards, with school colors of red and black. The school has no state championships on record in team athletics and activities. Due to their small enrollment, HSHS coops with nearby Midland High School for Boys and Girls Cross Country, and Boys and Girls Track and Field. Henry Co-ops with local Low-Point Washburn to make up their 8-man football team, the wildcats.

History
Henry-Senachwine High School was formed out of the 1947 consolidation of Henry (Township) High School and Senachwine (Township) High School in Putnam, Illinois. Henry participates in the Tri-county conference and under the late coach Steve Self they had multiple formidable seasons and in his second stint with the team he had a 100-69 record.

Notable alumni
 Brian Allard, Former MLB player (Texas Rangers, Seattle Mariners)

References

External links
 Henry-Senachwine High School
 Henry-Senachwine CUSD #5

Public high schools in Illinois
Schools in Marshall County, Illinois